Baliochila barnesi, the Barnes's buff, is a butterfly in the family Lycaenidae. It is found in eastern Zimbabwe, western Mozambique and the Democratic Republic of the Congo.

Adults have been recorded on wing in November, December, March and April.

The larvae feed on algae (cyanobacteria) growing on trees.

References

Butterflies described in 1953
Poritiinae